Orlin Stanoytchev (Bulgarian: Орлин Станойчев) (born 24 September 1971) is a former professional tennis player from Bulgaria.

Career
Stanoytchev, the Bulgarian junior champion in 1989, made the second round of a Grand Slam just once, but came close on other occasions. Twice at Wimbledon he lost five set matches in the opening round, one of which was against Todd Woodbridge in 1999, with the Australian winning 10–8 in the final set. When he finally broke through for his first win, at the 2000 French Open, it was from two sets down, beating Stéphane Huet. He experienced the reverse in the US Open later that year, losing to world number six Yevgeny Kafelnikov, despite winning the first two sets.

He reached two quarter-finals on the ATP Tour during his career, the first time in 1996 at Toulouse and the other in the 1999 Czech Open. The best win of his career came in the 1999 Majorca Open, when he defeated world number 22 Albert Costa.

The Bulgarian made regular Davis Cup appearances for his country throughout the 1990s, playing 11 ties in all. He won nine of his 16 singles matches and had a 1/2 record in doubles.

Year-end rankings

Challenger and Futures finals

Singles: 12 (5–7)

Doubles: 9 (5–4)

w/o = Walkover

Davis Cup 
Orlin Stanoytchev debuted for the Bulgaria Davis Cup team in 1991. Since then he has 9 nominations with 11 ties played, his singles W/L record is 9–7 and doubles W/L record is 1–2 (10–9 overall).

Singles (9–7)

Doubles (1–2) 

RR = Round Robin
RPO = Relegation Play-off

References

External links
 
 
 

1971 births
Living people
Bulgarian male tennis players
Sportspeople from Sofia
Bulgarian expatriate sportspeople in Switzerland
20th-century Bulgarian people